Life in Park Street is a 2012 Indian Bengali film directed by Raj Mukherjee. This film revolves around the people and their lives of Park Street, Kolkata.

Plot 
Park Street is a cosmopolitan place in Kolkata and the film focuses different aspects of life of this locality. Different characters like drug addict young girl, gay raping boys, pimps, housewife having affair with others etc.

Cast 
 Soumitra Chatterjee
 Debashree Roy as Radhika
 Shankar Chakraborty
 Baishakhi Marjit
 Jagannath Guha

See also 
 Dwando

References

External links 

2012 films
Films set in Kolkata
Bengali-language Indian films
2010s Bengali-language films